W33A is a protostar located approximately 12,000 light-years away from Earth, in the constellation Sagittarius. As a star in the early stages of formation, it has attracted the interest of astronomers, who observed that while the protostar is accumulating material from surrounding clouds of gas and dust, it is simultaneously ejecting fast moving jets of particles from its north and south poles.

References

External links
An Inventory of Interstellar Ices toward the Embedded Protostar W33A, by Gibb, E. L.; Whittet, D. C. B.; Schutte, W. A.; Boogert, A. C. A.; Chiar, J. E.; Ehrenfreund, P.; Gerakines, P. A.; Keane, J. V.; Tielens, A. G. G. M.; van Dishoeck, E. F.; and Kerkhof, O., The Astrophysical Journal, Volume 536, Issue 1, pp. 347–356, DOI:	10.1086/308940, Harvard University
VLTI/MIDI 10 μm Interferometry of the Forming Massive Star W33A, by W. J. de Wit1, M. G. Hoare1, R. D. Oudmaijer1 and J. C. Mottram1, 2007 ApJ 671 L169-L172, School of Physics and Astronomy, University of Leeds, Leeds LS2 9JT, UK

Protostars
Sagittarius (constellation)